The baroque trumpet is a musical instrument in the brass family. Invented in the mid-20th century, it is based on the natural trumpet of the 16th to 18th centuries, but designed to allow modern performers to imitate the earlier instrument when playing music of that time. Often synonymous with 'natural trumpet', the term 'baroque trumpet' is often used to differentiate an instrument which has added vent holes and other modern compromises, from an original or replica natural trumpet which does not.

History

See natural trumpet.

Modern reproductions
The term "baroque trumpet" has come to mean a version of the original natural trumpet, with changes to suit modern players, who tend to play both the modern trumpet and this hybrid. The hybrid instrument is most often employed by period instrument ensembles when choosing historically informed performance practice. Originals are seldom used, because they are too valuable.

Some modern performers use natural trumpets unchanged in design since the Baroque era. However, the majority now choose baroque trumpets constructed with vents, which were not used in the Baroque. The use of natural versus baroque trumpets is controversial. In general, however, most professional trumpeters regard the modern baroque trumpet, with at least one vent hole, as a necessary compromise to ensure acceptable intonation and secure attack for players of modern trumpets, while still providing an approximation of the original sound.

Tuning
The most important reason for using a baroque trumpet is to allow alternative tunings for problematic notes. The harmonic series is mostly "in tune" but there are a few notes which are "off-centre". It is normal for natural trumpet players to lip notes into tune (see natural trumpet), but players moving from the modern trumpet are not accustomed to lipping notes to that extent, which leads them to use the baroque trumpet.

Temperaments of the period centre on just intonation and meantone temperament. The harmonic series of the trumpet requires less lipping for these period temperaments than when playing in the equal temperament that modern players are used to.

The out-of-tune f2 and a2 (written, relative to a fundamental of C) are usually sounded only briefly in passing. Baroque composers such as Bach and Handel were careful not to ask their trumpeters to "dwell" on the f2 and a2 for any length of time. The other out-of-tune notes (B in both octaves) are even less frequently used, while the 11th harmonic is closer to an F# and usually played as such. Within the context of meantone temperament, the 11th harmonic is very nearly in tune.

Inaccurate harmonics
With twice the length of tubing of a modern trumpet, the natural trumpet has harmonics much closer together, meaning that the risk of a performer hitting the wrong harmonic is higher. But also it is almost impossible to hit a harmonic that conflicts with the harmony, and the effect is a direct parallel of an expressive ornament.

Lipping notes into tune increases the chance of a missed note, but the improved acoustics of a trumpet constructed without the need for vents somewhat makes up for the difference.

A common view is that in an era of recordings, conductors usually prefer trumpet players to have accuracy in pitch and tuning rather than the authentic sound, with the result that players use the baroque trumpet, a compromise between the natural trumpet and the modern trumpet.

Construction
Some baroque trumpets have been made using modern manufacturing methods, not the hand-hammered technique employed by master craftsmen such as Schnitzer, Haas, Hainlein, Ehe, and others. There is evidence, for example, that the bore anomalies of museum originals may favor certain notes, making it possible to "lip" the out-of-tune notes with greater ease. This characteristic is absent in factory-made instruments, with their geometrically perfect bore.

Bore anomalies include (but are not limited to) imperfectly soldered seam tubing and telescoping joints. Each of the five joints — crook or bit to 1st yard; 1st yard to distal bow; distal bow to 2nd yard; 2nd yard to proximal bow; and proximal bow to bell section — represents a "choke-point", the upstream tubing being shrunk to telescope into the expanded downstream ferrule. The slight acoustical perturbations so produced suggest a further eroding of the harmonic series' rigidity, and a consequently greater flexibility is available to the player. As a side note, these joints are a friction fit without the use of solder.

"Acoustically, the introduction of nodal vent holes, which need to be positioned relative to the total length of tubing, necessitates tuning slides (usually made from machine-drawn tubing), separate back bows, "yards" and mouth-pipes for different keys; meaning thicker walls, bows and variations in bore and conicity in the wrong places; needing compensation with a conical lead-pipe, which changes bell acoustics, and so on."

Sound
A natural trumpet is audibly different from a baroque one constructed with vents, even if the holes are covered, and when a vent is uncovered it is noticeably weaker and less resonant. Modern performers who choose to play vented instruments avoid the difficulty of vented notes being heard clearly, since baroque scores generally only use the particular out-of-tune notes in passing.

"[Use is] negating the possibility of playing many of the articulations indicated by composers or using a wooden transposing mute."

Posture
Pictures of natural trumpet players show the instrument nobly pointing upwards, held in one hand. Baroque trumpets usually require two hands, with the instrument pointing downwards. The breathing space of the player is less open.

How it works
When opened, the vent hole creates a node, or a position along the vibrating air column, where the pressure variations are at a minimum. This creates a transposition — in the case of a single thumb vent hole, the entire harmonic series of the trumpet is shifted up by a fourth.

Instruments

One vent
Players in continental Europe most commonly use modern replicas built with one hole, such as with the "Modell Tarr" made by Ewald Meinl Musikinstrumentenbau GmbH of Germany, the hole of which is usually covered by the right thumb. Most of the time, the hole remains covered, allowing the instrument to sound in its original key, whether B, C, D, E, or F. In order to play the out-of-tune 11th and 13th harmonics (notated f2, and a2), for example, the player opens the thumb vent hole and plays the f2 and a2 as the 8th and 10th harmonics of the new series.

Three or four vents
British players tend to prefer baroque trumpets with three or four holes, allowing the player to make half-step transpositions and blow a relatively easy high C.

An example of a multi-hole baroque trumpet is the coiled Jägertrompete made by Helmut Finke, used by the Concentus musicus Wien on many of their early recordings. However, this model has fallen out of favor with period instrument groups, and is seldom used nowadays.

Mouthpieces
The mouthpiece plays a role in re-creating an "authentic" performance. Many trumpeters continue to use a version of their modern mouthpiece on the baroque trumpet, fitted with a larger shank. This is unfortunate, since the art of playing in the highest clarino (clear) register depended to a great extent on the typical shallow-cupped mouthpiece of the period. When using the shallow-cupped mouthpiece, there is not only a greater ease in the upper register but also a lighter, less forceful sound. The latter blends better, is less tiring to the player, and is far more appropriate when performing with other baroque-style instruments.

See also
Natural trumpet

References

External links
Crispian Steele-Perkins interview by Bruce Duffie
Early Trumpet History and Connection to the Baroque-Era Natural Trumpet

Baroque instruments
Natural horns and trumpets